Bonstetten may refer to:

Places:
Bonstetten, Switzerland, a village of the Canton of Zürich
Bonstetten, Bavaria, a community of Bavaria
von Bonstetten, a historical noble family and Swiss surname
Albrecht von Bonstetten (d. c. 1504), deacon at Einsiedeln and humanist writer
Charles Victor de Bonstetten (1745-1832), Swiss writer
Walter von Bonstetten (1867-1949), Swiss Guide and Scout Movement notable